is a former Japanese football player.

Club statistics

References

External links

1985 births
Living people
Association football people from Miyagi Prefecture
Japanese footballers
J1 League players
J2 League players
J3 League players
Japan Football League players
Kawasaki Frontale players
Yokohama FC players
Vegalta Sendai players
Fujieda MYFC players
Association football forwards